Energy Policy Act may refer to U.S. Federal:

Energy Policy Act of 1992
Energy Policy Act of 2005

See also
 Federal Power Act
 Internal Revenue Service and Federal Hybrid Tax Credit Summary
 Energy Independence and Security Act of 2007